Las Flores can refer to:

Places
 Las Flores, Buenos Aires, Argentina
 Las Flores Partido, Buenos Aires Province, Argentina
 Las Flores, Rosario, Argentina
 Las Flores, Belize, Belize
 Flores, Petén, Guatemala
 Las Flores, Lempira, Honduras
 Las Flores (archaeological site), archaeological site in Tampico, Mexico
 Las Flores, California, United States of America
 Las Flores, Tehama County, California, United States of America
 Las Flores, Maldonado, a village in Uruguay
 Las Flores, Rivera, a village in Uruguay
 Las Flores (Mexibús, Line 3), a BRT station in Chimalhuacán, Mexico
 Las Flores (Mexibús, Line 4), a BRT station in Tecamac, Mexico
 Las Flores Zacuautitla (Mexibús), a BRT station in Coacalco de Berriozábal, Mexico

Other
 Las Flores Handicap, American horse race